Sha Wujing is one of the three disciples of the Buddhist pilgrim Tang Sanzang in the 16th century novel Journey to the West written by Wu Cheng'en in the Ming dynasty, although versions of his character predate the Ming novel. In the source novel, his background is the least developed of the pilgrims, and he contributes the least to their efforts.

Names
In English renditions of the story, the character is called "Friar Sand", "Sand Monk", "Sandman", "Sand Fairy", "Sand Orc", "Sand Ogre", "Sand Troll", "Sand Oni", "Sand Demon", "Sand Monster", "Sand Hulk", "Sand", or "Sandy", and is sometimes referred to as a "water buffalo" in reference to his low intelligence. His Buddhist Dharma name, "Sha Wujing", given to him by the bodhisattva Guanyin, means "sand aware of purity". His name is rendered in Korean as Sa Oh Jeong, into Japanese as Sa Gojō, into Sino-Vietnamese as Sa Ngộ Tịnh. He is also known as "Monk Sha" (Sa Tăng in Sino-Vietnamese; Sua Cheng in Thai) or Sha Heshang (沙和尚 colloquial Chinese).

Overview
Like Zhu Bajie, Wujing was originally a general in Heaven, more specifically a Curtain-Lifting General (卷帘大将 juǎnlián dàjiàng). In a fit of rage, he destroyed a valuable vase. Other sources say that he had done this unintentionally, and it was an accident. Nevertheless, he was punished by the Jade Emperor, who had him struck 800 times with a rod and exiled to earth, where he was to be reincarnated as a terrible man-eating sandman, orc, ogre, troll, oni, demon, monster, or hulk. There, he lived in the Liúshā-hé (流沙河, "flowing-sand river", or "quicksand-river"). Each day, seven flying swords sent from Heaven would stab him in the chest and then return. He had to live in the river full-time to avoid the punishment.

Wujing's appearance was grisly. He had a red beard and sometimes had blue skin, and he was partially bald and sometimes much more bigger, and stronger than an average human being (reminiscent of the later inspiration for the hulk from Marvel Comics). A necklace consisting of skulls made him look even more terrible. He still carried the weapon he had in Heaven, a magic wooden staff, called "Zhangyaobaozhang" (Monster-subduing Precious Rod), created for him by Lu Ban (often depicted in artwork as a Monk's spade). According to one story, an earlier group of nine monks on a pilgrimage west to fetch the scriptures met their end at the hands of Wujing. Heedless of their pleas for mercy, he devoured them, sucked the marrow from their bones, and threw their skulls into the river. Unlike his other victims whose bone sank to the river bottom, the skulls of the monks floated. This fascinated and delighted Wujing, who strung them on a rope and played with them when he was bored.

Later, Guanyin, the bodhisattva of compassion, and her disciple Prince Moksha came searching for powerful bodyguards in preparation of Tang Sanzang's journey west. She recruited Wujing, in exchange for which, she granted some respite from his suffering. She then converted him to Buddhism and gave him his current name, Shā Wùjìng. His surname Shā ("sand") was taken from his river home, while his new name Wùjìng means "awakened to purity" or "aware of purity". Finally, he was instructed to wait for a monk who would call for him. When Wujing does meet Tang Sanzang, he is mistaken for an enemy and attacked by Sun Wukong and Zhu Bajie. Guanyin is forced to intervene for the sake of the journey.

After the misunderstanding was cleared up, Wujing became the third disciple of Tang Sanzang, who called him Shā-héshàng (i.e. the "sand priest"; a héshàng is a Buddhist monk or priest in charge of a temple; in Japanese, oshō). Now, he was clad in a Buddhist pilgrim's robe and his skull-necklace was turned into a bhikkhu's one. During the Journey to the West, his swimming ability was useful. He always carried a small gourd which he could turn into a huge one, in order to cross rivers. Wujing was a kind-hearted and obedient person and loyal to his master, and, compared to his fellow disciples, Wujing serves as a 'Straight man' character. Amongst the trio, he was likely the most polite and the most logical. At the journey's end, Buddha transformed him into an arhat known as the Golden-bodied Arhat.

As the third disciple, even though his fighting skills are not as great as that of Wukong or Bajie, he is still a great warrior protecting Tang Sanzang and can use his intellect as well as his strength to beat the enemy. He knows only 18 forms of transformation and, in the middle of the story, admits as much.

Historical origins
Sha Wujing is the end result of embellishing a supernatural figure mentioned in Monk Hui Li's 7th-century account of the historical Xuanzang called Daciensi Sanzang Fashi Zhuan (A Biography of the Tripitaka-master of the Great Ci'en Monastery). According to the text, Xuanzang spilled his surplus of water while in the deserts near Dunhuang. After several days without liquid, Xuanzang had a dream where a tall spirit wielding a ji (halberd) chastised him for sleeping on such an important journey to get scriptures from India. He immediately woke up and got on his horse, which took off in a different direction than what he wanted to go. They finally came to an oasis with green grass and fresh water.

The Tang Sanzang ji (唐三藏记, Record of the Tang Monk Tripitaka), a book of unknown date appearing in an 11th-century Japanese collection of tales known as Jōbodai shū (成菩堤集), states Xuanzang (Tang Sanzang) was magically provided food and drink by a Deva while in the "Flowing Sands" (liusha, 流沙) desert.  The compiler of the Jōbodai shū explained: "This is the reason for the name Spirit of the Deep Sands (Shensha shen, 深沙神)." After performing a pilgrimage to China in 838–839, the Japanese Buddhist monk Jōgyō (常晓) wrote a report which mentions Xuanzang's fabled exchange with the deity, as well as equates Shensha shen with King Vaiśravaṇa, one of the Four Heavenly Kings of Buddhism. Therefore, the Tang Sanzang ji most likely hails from the Tang Dynasty (618–907). The Jōbodai shū also mentions the god manifested itself before the famous Chinese Buddhist monk Faxian (c. 4th century) during his pilgrimage to India. Shensha shen tells him: "I am manifested in an aspect of fury. My head is like a crimson bowl. My two hands are like the nets of heaven and earth. From my neck hang the heads of seven demons. About my limbs are eight serpents, and two demon heads seem to engulf my (nether-) limbs…"

By the compiling of the "Kōzanji version" (高山记, 13th century), the earliest known edition of Journey to the West, Shensha shen was transformed into a blood thirsty demon who had continuously eaten Tang Sanzang's past reincarnations. The demon tells him: "Slung here from my neck are the dry bones from when I twice before devoured you, monk!" Shensha Shen only helps him to pass over the deep sands with the aid of a magic golden bridge after Tang Sanzang threatens him with heavenly retribution.

As can be seen, the complete version of Journey to the West anonymously published in 1592 borrowed liberally from tales concerning Shensha shen. The character of Sha Wujing was given his monstrous appearance and dress. The skulls of the nine Buddhist monks hanging from his head recalls both the demon skulls worn by the spirit, and the skulls of Tang Sanzang's past incarnations worn by his wrathful counterpart from the Kōzanji version. His home of the "Flowing Sands River" (Liusha he 流沙河) is derived from the "Flowing Sands" desert inhabited by Shensha shen. Sha Wujing also aids Tang Sanzang pass over the Flowing Sands River by tying his nine skulls into a makeshift raft.

See also

List of media adaptations of Journey to the West

References

Journey to the West characters
Fictional Buddhist monks
Fictional Chinese people in literature
Fictional generals